Cattell may refer to:

People
Alexander G. Cattell,  (February 12, 1816 – April 8, 1894),  former United States senator from New Jersey.
Alfred Cattell, Wales international rugby player
James McKeen Cattell, the first psychology professor in the United States, father of Psyche Cattell
Psyche Cattell, (August 2, 1893 – April 1989), American psychologist
Raymond Cattell, psychologist, (20 March 1905 – 2 February 1998), did major work in a variety of psychological research fields.
Richard Cattell (rugby union), (1871–1948), English rugby union player
William Cassady Cattell, President of Lafayette College from 1863 to 1883.

Places
 Cattell Street, in Easton, Pennsylvania

Science
Cattell Culture Fair III, an IQ test constructed by Raymond Cattell, tested for both fluid and crystallized intelligence.
Cattell–Horn–Carroll theory, a psychological theory.
Cattell Infant Intelligence Scale, a developmental intelligence test for young children